Pięć Dwa Dębiec (52 Dębiec, Pięć Dwa, 5-2) is a Polish music group playing mainly rap.

Activity
The group was founded in Poznań in 1999 by Hans (Przemysław Frencel) and Deep (Paweł Paczkowski). In 2000 they published illegal album called Najwyższa instancja. In 2002 Deep left the group and stopped his activities for two years. On September 15, 2003, UMC Records published their first legal album called P-Ń VI. Deep didn't take part in the recording, but the album was published as 52 Dębiec (not as solo of Hans). On the spring of 2004 Deep published illegal album called We mnie, recorded in three months using home methods. On January 1, 2006, Hans became artistic director of UMC Records, but he resigned after one year. In that time he published Deep's and Bobik's album Refleksje. In June 2007 the group was back in full squad and informed about the recording of new album called Deep Hans. It was out on February 6, 2008. On June 2, 2008, 520 special, manually numbered copies were put up for sale (number 52 was given on a charity auction). The gain was used to record the next album.

The album T.R.I.P was planned to be published in May 2009, but on April, 20th the group's studio "Myself" was robbed. With the equipment the only copy of recorded material was stolen. At the end the album was published on October 31, 2009.

Discography

Albums

Compilation albums

Charted songs

Guest performances

Music videos

References

External links 
 Strona oficjalna - Pięć Dwa Dębiec

Polish hip hop groups